Catarina Ykens (born 1659) was a Flemish still life painter.

She was born in Antwerp into a family of painters as the daughter of Johannes Ykens and his second wife Barbara Brekevelt. She was the sister of Peter Ykens. She apprenticed under her father and joined the Antwerp Guild in 1688. She became a Beguine and composed oil paintings. Her works often combined religious scenes with garlands of flowers.

Selected works
A swag of fruit hanging in a niche, with butterflies, beetles and a snail
Madonna and child encompassed by a garland of flowers
Flowers in a glass vase with a dragonfly on a ledge
Portrait of a gentleman in armour surrounded by festoons of fruit and flowers
Still life with flowers in copper vase and in basket

References

1659 births
Flemish women painters
Flemish Baroque painters
Flemish still life painters
Artists from Antwerp
Year of death missing
17th-century women artists